The national anthem of Mauritania, also known by its incipit, "", was adopted on 16 November 2017 and was composed by Egyptian composer Rageh Daoud.

History
In March 2017, following a referendum to amend the constitution of July 1991, the Mauritanian National Assembly adopted a new national anthem to replace the previous one, which was considered almost impossible to sing.

Lyrics 
The anthem currently has six verses, with a chorus repeated after each verse. The fifth verse (in brackets) is sung in an extended version of the anthem. It was first sung on the 57th independence day of Mauritania, on 28 November 2017.

Full lyrics

Short version 
On official occasions requiring brevity, a short version is sung, comprising verse one (which is repeated), the chorus (which is split before line three), verse two and verse six.

See also
 Flag of Mauritania
 National anthem of Mauritania (1960–2017)
 Seal of Mauritania

Notes

References

External links
MP3
New National Anthem of Mauritania sung in 57th independence celebration (Extended Version)
New National Anthem of Mauritania (Children's version)

Mauritania
Mauritanian music
National symbols of Mauritania
National anthem compositions in E-flat major
Mauritania